Madhugiri Lok Sabha constituency was a former Lok Sabha constituency in Mysore State (Karnataka from 1967 to 1977).  This seat came into existence in 1967 and ceased to exist in 1976, before 1977 Lok Sabha Elections. This constituency was later merged with Tumkur Lok Sabha constituency.

Members of Parliament 

1952-66: Constituency does not exist
1967: Mali Mariappa, Indian National Congress
1967: Sudha V Reddy, Indian National Congress
1971: K. Mallanna, Indian National Congress
1977 Onwards: Constituency does not exist

Notes

See also
 Tiptur Lok Sabha constituency
 Tumkur Lok Sabha constituency
 Tumkur district
 List of former constituencies of the Lok Sabha

Tumkur district
1977 disestablishments in India
Lok Sabha constituencies in Mysore
Former constituencies of the Lok Sabha
Constituencies disestablished in 1977
Former Lok Sabha constituencies of Karnataka